X-Ray Vision is a 7", 33⅓ rpm EP released by The Moldy Peaches.  There are three copyright dates listed on the album: 1994, 1995, and 1996.  An insert inside the album states that Adam Green was the sole member of The Moldy Peaches at the time of the recording.  However, future member Kimya Dawson is listed on the credits of the album and sings lead on "Little Bunny Foo Foo."  Each record is numbered and there are 300 copies.

Track listing
 "Rap Sux!" - Ft. Joel
 "Little Bunny Foo Foo" - Ft. Kimya
 "On Top"
 "I Wish I Was Ben Lee"
 "Flea Circus"
 "Moldy Peaches in Da House"
 "Punching Bag" - Ft. Joel

Personnel
 Adam - Recorded & Produced By
 Kimya - vocals on "Little Bunny Foo Foo"
 Joel - drums on "Rap Sux!" and "Punching Bag"
 Denise - bass on "Little Bunny Foo Foo"
 Kurt - drums on "Little Bunny Foo Foo"

1996 debut albums
The Moldy Peaches albums